Bunkie is a city in Avoyelles Parish, Louisiana, United States. The population was 4,171 at the 2010 census.

History
Bunkie was founded as a station terminus on the Texas and Pacific Railroad line. It was named for the daughter (whose nickname was "Bunkie") of the original landowner.

The federal post office in town contains a mural, Cotton Pickers, painted in 1939 during the Great Depression by Caroline Speare Rohland. Federally commissioned murals were produced from 1934 to 1943 in the United States through the Section of Painting and Sculpture, later called the Section of Fine Arts, of the Treasury Department. This work was part of the effort by the federal government to employ artists during the difficult Depression years.

The area around Bunkie is devoted to agriculture; since the late 20th century, corn has been an important commodity crop. Since 1987, Bunkie has hosted the annual Louisiana Corn Festival during the second full weekend of June.

Geography

Climate

Demographics

2020 census

As of the 2020 United States census, there were 3,346 people, 1,702 households, and 1,227 families residing in the city.

2000 census
As of the census of 2000, there were 4,662 people, 1,698 households, and 1,198 families residing in the city. The racial makeup of the city was 48.54% White, 50.26% African American, 0.04% Native American, 0.28% Asian, 0.34% from other races, and 0.54% from two or more races. Hispanic or Latino of any race were 1.48% of the population.

There were 1,698 households, out of which 35.2% had children under the age of 18 living with them, 39.4% were married couples living together, 26.6% had a female householder with no husband present, and 29.4% were non-families. 26.3% of all households were made up of individuals, and 11.8% had someone living alone who was 65 years of age or older. The average household size was 2.66 and the average family size was 3.22.

In the city, the population was spread out, with 30.3% under the age of 18, 9.1% from 18 to 24, 23.8% from 25 to 44, 20.6% from 45 to 64, and 16.2% who were 65 years of age or older. The median age was 35 years. For every 100 females, there were 82.5 males. For every 100 females age 18 and over, there were 73.2 males.

The median income for a household in the city was $14,745, and the median income for a family was $23,448. Males had a median income of $31,382 versus $19,479 for females. The per capita income for the city was $10,302. About 34.4% of families and 37.8% of the population were below the poverty line, including 38.9% of those under age 18 and 32.5% of those age 65 or over.

Notable people
Bunkie is the birthplace of jazz drummer Zutty Singleton.
Sue Eakin, Louisiana historian and former publisher of the Bunkie Record, resided in Bunkie for most of her life until her death in 2009 at the age of 90. Her works include Avoyelles Parish: Crossroads of Louisiana.
Physician Donald E. Hines, a former member of the Louisiana State Senate, who served from 2004 to 2008 as Senate president.
Ronnie Johns, a member of the Louisiana State Senate from Sulphur in Calcasieu Parish, grew up in Bunkie and graduated from Bunkie High School in 1967.
Seymour Weiss, former owner and longtime manager of the Roosevelt Hotel in New Orleans, close confidant of Huey Pierce Long, Jr., prominent New Orleans civic leader, who was born in Bunkie in 1896.

References

External links
City of Bunkie official website
Bunkie Chamber of Commerce
Bunkie community website

Cities in Louisiana
Cities in Avoyelles Parish, Louisiana